Strandfontein Library is a public library in Strandfontein, Cape Town, South Africa. It is part of the City of Cape Town Library and Information Services. The library's holdings can be searched online via the City of Cape Town's Open Public Access Catalogue (OPAC).

References

Libraries in Cape Town